Canopy FGF signaling regulator 2 is a protein that in humans is encoded by the CNPY2 gene.

References

Further reading 

 
 
 
 

Clusters of differentiation